White People is a 1991 short story collection by author Allan Gurganus.

Overview
A collection of eleven short stories about people white and not white from the modern Southern United States.

References

English-language novels
Novels about race and ethnicity
Works about White Americans
1991 short story collections
American short story collections
Alfred A. Knopf books
PEN/Faulkner Award for Fiction-winning works
Southern United States in fiction